The 1983 Manitoba municipal elections were held in October 1983 to elect mayors, councillors, and school trustees in various communities throughout Manitoba, Canada.

Cities

Winnipeg

Towns

Hartney

Footnotes

Municipal elections in Manitoba
Manitoba
Municipal elections
Manitoba municipal elections